Valerie Bryson is a British political scientist, who has published extensively on feminist theory and politics. She was appointed professor of politics at the University of Huddersfield in 2002, and is founder of the Centre for Democracy and Governance in 2006, serving as its director until 2008. Since 2010, she has been professor emerita.

Her books include Feminist Debates, which has also been translated into Japanese, and Feminist Political Theory, which has also been translated into Greek and Russian (the latter one by Olga Lipovskaya). She has been a visiting professor at the Centre of Gender Excellence in Örebro since 2007.

Books
Jonasdottir, A., Bryson, V. and Jones, K. (2010) Sexuality, Gender and Power: Intersectional and Transnational Perspectives . Routledge Advances in Feminist Studies and Intersectionality. : Routledge . 
Bryson, V (2007) Gender and the politics of time: feminist theory and contemporary debates . Bristol, UK: The Policy Press . 
Blakeley, G. and Bryson, V. (2007) The impact of feminism on political concepts and debates . London, UK: Manchester University Press . 
Bryson, V (2003) Feminist political theory: an introduction . Basingstoke: Palgrave Macmillan . 
Blakeley, G. and Bryson, V. (2002) Contemporary political concepts . London, UK: Pluto .

References

British political scientists
Living people
Year of birth missing (living people)
Place of birth missing (living people)
Academics of the University of Huddersfield
Women political scientists
British socialist feminists